Michael William Grebe (born October 25, 1940) is an American philanthropist, lawyer, businessman and conservative activist. He served as the chairman and CEO of the law firm Foley & Lardner from 1994 to 2002. From 2002 through 2016, he was  President and Chief Executive Officer of the Bradley Foundation. He is the former Chairman of the Philanthropy Roundtable.

Early life
Grebe grew up in Farmington, Illinois, and played quarterback on his high school football team. He graduated from the United States Military Academy with a B.S. in 1962 and received a J.D. from the University of Michigan Law School in 1970, magna cum laude. Grebe served in the United States Army during the Vietnam War and was later awarded the Combat Infantryman’s Badge and two Bronze Stars. He served on active duty from 1962 to 1967 and attained the rank of captain.

Career
Grebe joined the law firm Foley & Lardner in 1970, and became a partner in 1977, focusing on corporate and financial law. He served as Chairman and CEO from 1994, until he retired in 2002, when he became Chairman and CEO of the Bradley Foundation. He also serves as Chairman of the Philanthropy Roundtable.

He has served on the board of directors of the Oshkosh Corporation since 1990. He also sits on the board of the Church Mutual Insurance Company. He is a former member and president of the board of regents for the University of Wisconsin System and past member and chairman of the board of visitors of his alma mater, the United States Military Academy. He has also sat on the board of the Hoover Institution at Stanford University and the Milwaukee Brewers baseball club. He sits on the board of the Charter School Growth Fund. He sits on the publication committee of National Affairs. He is also on the board of directors of the BMO Harris Bradley Center

He is a former general counsel to the Republican National Committee and was the Republican National Committeeman for Wisconsin from 1984 to 2002. He was a delegate to Republican National Conventions from 1984 to 2000. In 2010, he chaired Scott Walker's campaign for governorship of Wisconsin.

Personal life
Grebe's first wife, Peggy, died in 2003. They had 2 children, a son and a daughter. He married Patricia Perry in 2005. They live in Milwaukee, Wisconsin. In 2015, Wisconsin Governor Walker appointed Grebe's son, Michael M. Grebe, to UW Board of Regents.

References

External links
 

1940 births
Living people
People from Farmington, Illinois
United States Military Academy alumni
Military personnel from Illinois
United States Army officers
United States Army personnel of the Vietnam War
University of Michigan Law School alumni
Lawyers from Milwaukee
Wisconsin lawyers
Businesspeople from Milwaukee
Wisconsin Republicans
Charter schools